Grand Meadow Township is a township in Clayton County, Iowa, USA.  As of the 2019 census, its population was 818.

History
Grand Meadow Township was originally settled chiefly by Norwegian immigrants.

Geography
According to the USGS, it contains four cemeteries: East Clermont Lutheran, Fry, Grand Meadow and Postville.

Notes

References
 USGS Geographic Names Information System (GNIS)

External links
 US-Counties.com
 City-Data.com

Townships in Clayton County, Iowa
Townships in Iowa